The Nebo-SVU (also known as 1L119) (in Cyrillic: Небо-СВУ, 1Л119) is an very high frequency multi-functional radar and first radar with an active electronically scanned array antenna operating in the metric wavelength. The radar was introduced in 2001 as a replacement for Nebo-SV. Nebo-SVU radars can detect F-22, B-2, F-35 warplanes.

History

VHF radar systems have wavelengths comparable to aircraft feature sizes and should exhibit scattering in the resonance region rather than the optical region, allowing most stealth aircraft to be detected. Soviet Union was known for developing VHF radars with counter-stealth capability as P-12 and P-18 radars.  Request to detect stealthy aircraft's and provide anti aircraft systems with their coordinates prompted Nizhny Novgorod Research Institute of Radio Engineering (NNIIRT) to develop VHF AESA Nebo-SVU with digital signal processors, which is capable of performing target acquisition for Surface-to-air missile batteries such is S-300 missile system or S-400 missile system. Despite the advantages offered by VHF radar in detection of stealth aircraft's, their longer wavelengths result in lower resolution when compared to size of X-band radar array.

Design and description
Nebo-SVU is a solid state phased array with electronic beam steering in azimuth and elevation, more accurate than Nebo SV with much better mobility and incorporates a wide range of improvements. It retains as predecessor VHF element design, but has a difference as it uses vertical polarization. It has an array of 84 (14×6) vertically polarized VHF Yagis each with a 3/8 folded dipole and director element. MTFB is  contributed to modern technology used in production. It is produced by Almaz-Antey concern.

Radar Nebo SVU consists of:

 antenna-hardware post (AAP) on the semi-trailer ChMZAP 9907.2
 diesel power plants (DPPs) 
 ED 2×30-T400-1RA1M4 (or ED 2×30-T400-1RA1M6) on the chassis of the Ural vehicle or 
 ED 2×30-T400-1RA1M5 (or ED 2×30-T400-1RA1M7) on the chassis of a KamAZ vehicle

Deployment

Nebo-SVU is used to control arctic airspace by 45th Air and Air Defenсe Forces Army of Northern Fleet.

Operators

See also 

 Nebo-M

References 

Russian and Soviet military radars